Shavnabada is a mountain and extinct volcano of 770 m height in southeastern Georgia, some 96 km from the nation’s capital Tbilisi.

The mountain is notable for a medieval Georgian Orthodox monastery built there in honor of St. George who, according to a local legend, wore a black cloak (Georgian: shavi nabadi, hence the mountain’s name) when leading the army of the king of Georgia in one of the victorious battles. The monastery is known for its rare variety of wine, also called Shavnabada, made by the monks.    

"Shavnabada" is also a moniker for the 13th "Shavnabada" Light Infantry Battalion of the Georgian Army which was based at this mountain in the 1990s.

References

Georgian Orthodox monasteries
Volcanoes of Georgia (country)
Georgian words and phrases
Mountains of Georgia (country)
Extinct volcanoes